The nitridosilicates are chemical compounds that have anions with nitrogen bound to silicon. Counter cations that balance the electric charge are mostly electropositive metals from the alkali metals, alkaline earths or rare earth elements.  Silicon and nitrogen have similar electronegativities, so the bond between them is covalent. Nitrogen atoms are arranged around a silicon atom in a tetrahedral arrangement.

Related compounds include pnictogenidosilicates :phosphidosilicates, arsenidosilicates and antimonosilicates; pnictogenidogernamates: phosphidogermanates. By replacing silicon, there are also nitridogermanates, nitridostannates, nitridotantalates and nitridotitanates.

Use
Nitridosilicates are used as host substances for europium in LED phosphors. Examples include CASN (calcium aluminium silicide nitride) (CaAlSiN3), SCASN (SrCaAlSiN3) and SCSN (SrCaSiN3). These fluoresce red.

Production
Nitridosilicates can be made in a solid state reaction by heating silicon nitride with metallic nitrides in a nitrogen atmosphere at over 1300°C. If the mixtures are exposed to oxygen or air, then oxides or oxynitridosilicates are produced instead. Instead of metal nitrides, ammine complexes, amides or imides can be used instead. In place of the highly stable silicon nitride, silicon diimide can be used. Carbothermal reduction involves using a metal oxide or carbonate heated with carbon in a nitrogen atmosphere.

Properties 
The ratio of silicon to nitrogen varies from 1:4 to 7:10 (0.25 to 0.7) with increased condensation, and fewer sites for metals with high silicon content. At a ratio of 3:4 (0.75) there is no longer capacity for metal, as that is silicon nitride. The more condensed substances, with lower nitrogen content, have greater number of silicon atoms surrounding the nitrogen. This coordination number can vary from one to four, with the most common being three. The silicon atom always is coordinated by four nitrogen atoms. In the silicates, silicon is surrounded by four oxygen atoms, but each oxygen is only connected to one or two silicon atoms, and only very rarely three. So nitridosilicates can form more diverse structures than the silicates.

Nitridosilicates with higher proportion of silicon (more condensed) are more resistant to attack by water and oxygen, and so can be exposed to the atmosphere without decomposition. These condensed nitridosilicates are mechanically strong, and resistant to heat, acids and alkalis.

SiN4 tetrahedra can be connected to each other via vertices or edges. This differs from SiO4 which only connects via vertices.

Use
Nitridosilicates have been used to make abrasives, turbine blades, cutting tools and phosphors.

Nitridosilicates

References

Silicon compounds
Nitrogen compounds